Bernard Courtois, also spelled Barnard Courtois, (8 February 1777 – 27 September 1838) was a French chemist credited with first isolating iodine.

By 1811 the Napoleonic Wars had made the government-controlled saltpeter business taper off since there was by then a shortage of wood ashes with which potassium nitrate was made. As an alternative, the needed potassium nitrate was derived from seaweed that was abundant on the Normandy and Brittany shores. The seaweed also had another, yet undiscovered, important chemical. One day towards the end of 1811 while Courtois was isolating sodium and potassium compounds from seaweed ash, he discovered iodine after he added sulfuric acid to the seaweed ash. He was investigating corrosion of his copper vessels when he noticed a vapor given off. It was in the form of an unusual purple vapor. Humphry Davy later records

Later life 
Courtois was acknowledged by Humphry Davy and Joseph Louis Gay-Lussac as the true discoverer of iodine. He went into manufacturing high-quality iodine and its salts in 1822. In 1831 he was awarded 6,000 francs as part of the Montyon Prize by L'Academie royale des sciences for the medicinal value of this element. He struggled financially for the rest of his life and died 27 September 1838. He was 62 years old and had no assets left for his widow or son. In the year of his death, the Journal de chimie médicale drily noted his passing under the heading Obituary as:"Bernard Courtois, the discoverer of iodine, died at Paris the 27th of September, 1838, leaving his widow without fortune. If, on making this discovery, Courtois had taken out a certificate of invention, he would have realized a large estate."

Notes

References 
 Toraude, L. G., Bernard Courtois (1777–1838) et la découverte de l'iode (1811), Vigot Frères, Paris, 1921
 Smeaton, W. A., Guyton de Morveau's Course of Chemistry in the Dijon Academy, Ambix 1961, 9, 53–69

19th-century French chemists
1777 births
1838 deaths
Discoverers of chemical elements
Scientists from Dijon
19th-century French photographers
Iodine
École Polytechnique alumni
18th-century French chemists